During the 1992–93 English football season, Nottingham Forest competed in the inaugural season of the FA Premier League.

Season summary
The previous season, Forest had finished 8th and started the new season fairly well with an opening-day 1–0 win over Liverpool in Sky Sports' first-ever 'Super Sunday' match on 16 August 1992 which saw their first-ever live goal scored by Teddy Sheringham. However, after the sale of key players Sheringham and Des Walker, Forest struggled thereafter and after the promising display against Liverpool on the opening day, they went on the receiving end of six successive defeats - during which they leaked 18 goals - which would set the tone for a long season ahead of them. They were virtually never out of the relegation zone after their 2–0 home defeat to eventual champions Manchester United on 29 August 1992 and since the opening day, they won just two of their next 21 games before the new year, leaving them in bottom place, six points from safety.

However, their form after the new year exceptionally improved with a run of five wins in the next seven league games, cumulating in a 1–0 win over Queens Park Rangers on 24 February 1993, briefly lifting them out of the relegation zone on goal difference, during a very tight relegation dogfight at the time with only seven points separating second-bottom Middlesbrough and 12th-placed Chelsea. However, a 2–0 defeat to Manchester City and a 1–1 draw with relegation rivals Crystal Palace in their next two home games saw them sucked back into the bottom-three and after that, they could not keep up the momentum needed for survival, winning just two of the next ten games, leaving them needing to win their final two games in order to stand any chance of avoiding relegation. They were ultimately relegated in bottom place with their fate being confirmed on 1 May 1993 in a 2–0 home defeat to Sheffield United - among other results going against them - which also saw the Blades effectively secure their survival at the expense of Middlesbrough. Brian Clough retired at the end of the season, leaving Frank Clark to try and take Forest back to the Premier League.

During the off-season, young Irish midfielder Roy Keane - who was named in the PFA Team of the Year - was sold to Manchester United. He would play a major role in Manchester United's dominance of English football over the next decade.

Final league table

Results
Nottingham Forest's score comes first

Legend

FA Premier League

FA Cup

League Cup

Players

First-team squad
Squad at end of season

Left club during season

Reserve squad

Statistics

Starting 11
Considering appearances in all competitions

References

Nottingham Forest F.C. seasons
Nott